Sorobasso is a village and commune in the Cercle of Koutiala in the Sikasso Region of southern Mali. The commune covers an area of 133 square kilometers and includes 5 villages. In the 2009 census it had a population of 4,884. The village of Sorobasso, the administrative centre (chef-lieu) of the commune, is 30 km northeast of Koutiala on the Route Nationale 13 that links Koutiala with San.

References

External links
.

Communes of Sikasso Region